[[File:Katipunan ng mga Anak-Pawis sa Pilipinas Bulletin 7 November 1935.jpg|thumb|November 7, 1935 issue of the Katipunan ng mga Anak-Pawis sa Pilipinas bulletin]]
The Katipunan ng mga Anak-Pawis sa Pilipinas (KAP) (Tagalog, Proletarian Labor Congress of the Philippines''') was the third trade union federation in the Philippines. It was formed in 1929 after an antagonistic national convention of the Congreso Obrero de Filipinas (COF, "Philippine Labor Congress") where election results were manipulated caused Crisanto Evangelista and his faction to split from the COF. In 1930, the KAP changed its name to Partido Komunista ng Pilipinas after it initiated the formation of a "mass political party" and questions arose regarding its name.

Aside from Evangelista, other leaders of the KAP included Guillermo Capadocia, Manuel R. Joven, Mariano P. Balgos, and Pedro G. Castro. Evidently, the KAP persisted in some form or another after the establishment of the Partido Komunista ng Pilipinas''. Felixberto Olalia is mentioned as its Secretary-General in 1939.

See also
Anakpawis
Congreso Obrero de Filipinas
Partido Obrero de Filipinas
Unión Obrera Democrática Filipina

References

Trade unions established in 1929
National trade-union centers of the Philippines